Tavşancıl railway station was a railway station in Tavşancıl, Turkey on the Istanbul-Ankara railway. It was located in the southern part of the town on the shore of the Gulf of İzmit. The station was a stop on the Adapazarı Express regional train service; 11 daily eastbound trains and 13 daily westbound trains stopped at Tavşancıl. The opening date of the station is unclear, but the station was rebuilt and expanded in 1975, when the Turkish State Railways double-tracked the railway from Gebze to Arifiye. Tavşancıl station closed on 1 February 2012 and the platforms were demolished shortly after.

References

Railway stations in Kocaeli Province
Defunct railway stations in Turkey
Railway stations closed in 2012
2012 disestablishments in Turkey